Daniel Reule (born 2 May 1983, in Neuenbürg) is a German footballer who plays for SV Kickers Pforzheim as a striker. In the 2. Fußball-Bundesliga he has made seven appearances for Karlsuher SC between 2003 and 2005.

Honours
In August 2011, Reule was nominated for the Goal of the Month award after he scored a bicycle kick against FC Bayern Munich II.

References

External links 
 

1983 births
Living people
People from Neuenbürg
Sportspeople from Karlsruhe (region)
German footballers
Karlsruher SC players
Karlsruher SC II players
2. Bundesliga players
TSG 1899 Hoffenheim players
SV Waldhof Mannheim players
SSV Reutlingen 05 players
Stuttgarter Kickers players
FC Nöttingen players
Association football forwards
Footballers from Baden-Württemberg